Athanasios Iliadis (born 23 August 1952) is a Greek boxer. He competed in the men's welterweight event at the 1976 Summer Olympics.

References

1952 births
Living people
Greek male boxers
Olympic boxers of Greece
Boxers at the 1976 Summer Olympics
Competitors at the 1975 Mediterranean Games
Mediterranean Games bronze medalists for Greece
Sportspeople from Thessaloniki
Mediterranean Games medalists in boxing
Welterweight boxers
20th-century Greek people